St. Hilda's Secondary School (SHSS) is a co-educational government-aided secondary school in Tampines, Singapore, which offers a four to five-year course leading to a GCE 'O' Level and/or a GCE 'N' Level. It was named after the saint Hilda of Whitby and is affiliated with the Anglican Diocese of Singapore.

History
St. Hilda's traces its origins to a small private school, Bethel English School, founded in 1929 in a small two-storey building at Ceylon Road. It was taken over by the Anglican Diocese of Singapore in 1934, which the school has been affiliated with ever since, and opened as a parochial school for girls. In 1938 it was renamed St. Hilda's School. During the Japanese occupation, the school came under Japanese control but continued functioning, unlike many other mission schools which were either closed down or destroyed. After World War II ended, the school re-opened as a coeducational school. The post-war years were a period of rapid development as the school grew and expanded. It became a girls-only school in 1950 but has since become coeducational again. In 1988 the school was relocated to Tampines and was split into the secondary and primary schools.

Notable alumni
 Priscelia Chan: actress, Mediacorp
 Olinda Cho: finalist, Singapore Idol
 Fiona Xie: actress, MediaCorp

References

External links
School's website
SHSS E-magazine website

Secondary schools in Singapore
Educational institutions established in 1934
Anglican schools in Singapore
Tampines
1934 establishments in British Malaya